Burnham Point State Park is a  state park located on the St. Lawrence River in the Town of Cape Vincent in Jefferson County, New York, United States.

The park was established in 1898 as part of the St. Lawrence Reservation.

The park is 1 of 80 New York State Parks that are in the path of totality for the 2024 solar eclipse, with the park experiencing 3 minutes and 23 seconds of totality.

Park description
Burnham Point State Park is open from mid-May through Labor Day. The small park primarily offers space to camp, including 47 tent and trailer sites, 19 of which contain electrical hookups. The park also offers a boat launch, boat slips, fishing, hunting, pavilions, picnic tables, and a playground.

See also
 List of New York state parks

References

External links
 New York State Parks: Burnham Point State Park

State parks of New York (state)
Parks in Jefferson County, New York
Protected areas established in 1898
1898 establishments in New York (state)